Enrico Schirinzi (born 14 November 1984) is a former Swiss footballer.

Career
Raised in the BSC Young Boys, he played the first three years in FC Wohlen, in the second series, where he collected 85 appearances and 8 goals in the league. 

In the 2008-2009 season he made his debut in top flight playing 11 games with FC Luzern. In January he was transferred to Lugano, in the Challenge League, where he played 11 games (with one goal).

Back at Wohlen for the 2009-2010 season, after 59 appearances and 15 goals, he decided not to renew with the Swiss team.

After a period under test with Aston Villa in which he was not offered a contract, he signed with FC Thun on his return to Switzerland.

External links
 
 Enrico Schirinzi at Football.ch

1984 births
Living people
Swiss men's footballers
Swiss people of Italian descent
Italian footballers
Association football midfielders
FC Wohlen players
FC Luzern players
FC Lugano players
FC Thun players
FC Vaduz players
Swiss expatriate footballers
Swiss expatriate sportspeople in Liechtenstein
Breitenrain Bern players
Swiss Super League players
Swiss Challenge League players
Swiss Promotion League players
Swiss 1. Liga (football) players
2. Liga Interregional players
Italian expatriate footballers
Expatriate footballers in Liechtenstein
Footballers from Bern